EVN may refer to:

 Electric vehicle network
 Escape Velocity Nova, a video game
 European VLBI Network
 Evenki language
 EVN Group, an Austrian energy provider
 EVN AD Skopje, a subsidiary in North Macedonia
 , a subsidiary, owner of Toplofikatsiya Plovdiv and the Bulgarian part of the Gorna Arda Hydro Power Plant project
 Vietnam Electricity, a Vietnamese electricity provider
 Zvartnots International Airport, in Armenia
 Eurovision News Exchange; see Eurovision Network
English visual novel, a term used to refer to visual novels originally written in English
European Vehicle Number, an identifying marking for railway vehicles in Europe and some adjacent regions.